The Pirates of Malaysia is a 1964 swashbuckler directed by Umberto Lenzi and starring Steve Reeves as Sandokan the pirate. This film was a sequel to Reeve's 1963 film Sandokan the Great, also directed by Lenzi. Malaysian rebel, Sandokan, with his group of renegades, tries to thwart an evil British general from forcing the good Sultan Hassim to resign in favor of the Imperial crown.

Plot
The cruel Lord James Guillonk, faithful steward of Queen Victoria, is governor of the territories of Borneo and Malaysia. His archenemy is the Indian pirate Sandokan, who along with his band of rebels, the Tigers, has been leading attacks against the British forces.

This time, Sandokan again faces off against the governor, Lord Guillonk, who is waging a campaign against Tremal-Naik, a Hindu opposed to the British. Tremal-Naik tells Sandokan of the Thugs, a secret sect of Hindu fanatics that worship the bloody goddess Kali. The Thugs have kidnapped Tremal-Naik’s beloved, and are holding her in their dungeon. When his beloved mysteriously escapes from the Thug dungeon, only to fall into the hands of Lord Guillonk, Sandokan prepares for a new battle against the governor.

Cast
Steve Reeves as Sandokan
Jacqueline Sassard as  Hada
Andrea Bosic as  Yanez
Mimmo Palmara as  Tremal Naik
Pierre Cressoy as  Captain  
Leo Anchóriz as Lord Brook 
Franco Balducci as Sambigliong
Giuseppe Addobbati as  Muda
Dakar as  Kammamuri
Rik Battaglia as Sambigliong
Nando Gazzolo as  Clinton
George Wang as Sho Pa
Nazzareno Zamperla as Durango (credited as Nick Anderson)

Production
Pirates of Malaysia had a screenplay credited to Victor Andres Catena, Jaime Comas Gil, and Ugo Liberatore. The film was adapted by Liberatore and based on the novel by Emilio Salgari.

Release
Pirates of Malaysia was released in Italy on 16 October 1964 with a running time of 110 minutes.

References

Footnotes

Sources

External links
 

1964 films
Spanish adventure films
Italian adventure films
French adventure films
Films directed by Umberto Lenzi
Films based on the Indo-Malaysian cycle
Films set in Malaysia
Films set in the 19th century
Films scored by Giovanni Fusco
1964 adventure films
1960s Italian films
1960s French films